Serajul Haque is a Bangladesh Nationalist Party politician and the former Member of Parliament of Sherpur-3. His son, Mahmudul Haque Rubel, was elected to parliament in 2001.

Career
Haque was elected to parliament from Sherpur-3 as a Bangladesh Nationalist Party candidate in 1991.

References

Bangladesh Nationalist Party politicians
1994 deaths
5th Jatiya Sangsad members
1902 births